The Bundesstraße 185 (abbreviation: B 185) is a German federal road or Bundesstraße in the state of  Saxony-Anhalt. It runs from east to west connecting the town of Dessau-Roßlau with the Harz mountain region. Between Kleinpaschleben and Dessau-Roßlau the B 185 is part of the German Avenue Road.

History 
The present Bundesstraße 185 links the most important Residenz towns of the former Principality of Anhalt. Only the section between Aschersleben and Ermsleben lay on Prussian territory. This section was known as Prussian State Road No. 90a (preußische Staatschaussee Nr. 90a) which was completed in 1842.

The 64.7 km long Reichsstraße 185 between Dessau and Aschersleben was built around 1937. In the 1960s the road was extended as far as Alexisbad in the Harz mountains.

Route / Junctions

External links 

185
Transport in the Harz